Franz Hoffmeister (22 March 1898 – 27 March 1943) was a German Roman Catholic priest and the founder of the Sauerländer Heimatbund and Festspiele Balver Höhle.

Life
Hoffmeister was born in Ramsbeck. He was consecrated to a Roman Catholic priest by bishop Hähling von Lanzenauer in 1924.

References

In German
Theodor Pröpper, Franz Hoffmeister. Leben und Werk, Verlag Bonifatius Druckerei, Paderborn 1949

1898 births
1943 deaths
People from Hochsauerlandkreis
Westphalia culture
20th-century German Roman Catholic priests